Eamonn Rogers (born 16 April 1947) is an Irish former footballer who made 220 appearances in the English Football League playing for Blackburn Rovers, Charlton Athletic and Northampton Town as a midfielder, defender and forward.

Career
Rogers turned professional at Ewood Park in May 1965 and made his First Division debut in Rovers' 3-2 defeat at Stoke City four months later.

He was Rovers' joint top scorer in 1967-68 and 1970-71 seasons. Rogers made 177 Appearances for Rovers and scored 39 goals in all competitions. In 2006, he was voted into the Rovers fans team of the decade (1960's). He was also shortlisted for a place in the greatest of all time team.

He made an ill-advised move to Charlton Athletic in an exchange deal involving Barry Endean in October 1971 and spent two injury hit seasons there. He retired from professional football at the end 1973-74 season aged just 27.

He made his international debut for the Republic of Ireland national football team on 22 November 1967 in a 2-1 away win over Czechoslovakia and went on to win a total of 19 international caps and scored 5 times.

His brother John played for Shelbourne F.C. in the 1970s.

External links

1947 births
Living people
Republic of Ireland association footballers
Blackburn Rovers F.C. players
Charlton Athletic F.C. players
Northampton Town F.C. players
Association footballers from County Dublin
Republic of Ireland international footballers
Republic of Ireland under-23 international footballers
Association football midfielders
People from Crumlin, Dublin